Denys Molchanov and Igor Zelenay were the defending champions but chose not to defend their title.

Gong Maoxin and Zhang Ze won the title after defeating Max Purcell and Luke Saville 6–4, 6–4 in the final.

Seeds

Draw

References

 Main draw

Zhuhai Open - Doubles
2019 Doubles